Tsvetan Filipov (born 28 August 1988) is a Bulgarian footballer who plays as a midfielder for Neftochimic Burgas.

Career
Product of Naftex's youth system, Filipov's first professional appearance was as a 17-year-old for Pomorie, where he was loaned for the 2005–06 season. His brother Venelin is also footballer.

He joined Weston-super-Mare A.F.C. ahead of the 2015 season, but his arrival was delayed until September due to international clearance.  He scored one goal for the club before leaving by mutual consent in November 2015.

In June 2017, Filipov joined Neftochimic Burgas.

Club statistics
As of 20 July 2019

References

External links 
 
 Player Profile at Football24
 Player Profile at Sportal.bg

1988 births
Living people
Sportspeople from Burgas
Bulgarian footballers
First Professional Football League (Bulgaria) players
Second Professional Football League (Bulgaria) players
PFC Naftex Burgas players
FC Pomorie players
PFC Beroe Stara Zagora players
PFC Kaliakra Kavarna players
Weston-super-Mare A.F.C. players
Neftochimic Burgas players
FC Levski Karlovo players
Bulgarian expatriate footballers
Bulgarian expatriate sportspeople in Turkey
Bulgarian expatriate sportspeople in Poland
Bulgarian expatriate sportspeople in England
Expatriate footballers in Turkey
Expatriate footballers in Poland
Expatriate footballers in England
Association football midfielders
Wisła Puławy players